Raiding may refer to:

 The present participle of the verb Raid (disambiguation), which itself has several meanings
 Raid (military)
 Raid (video games), a group of video game players who join forces
 Raiding, Austria, a town in Austria
 Party raiding, a tactic in American politics